Muradymovo (Moraźım) is a rural locality (a village) in Sukhorechensky Selsoviet, Bizhbulyaksky District, Bashkortostan, Russia. The population was 198 as of 2010. There are 4 streets.

Geography 
Muradymovo is located 35 km west of Bizhbulyak (the district's administrative centre) by road. Novy Biktyash is the nearest rural locality.

References 

Rural localities in Bizhbulyaksky District